John Patrick Joseph Muldoon (born 21 November 1964) is an English former professional footballer who played for Wrexham in the Football League as a midfielder. He supplied the cross for Barry Horne's goal by which Wrexham eliminated FC Porto from the 1984–85 European Cup Winners' Cup. Muldoon also played for IFK Mariehamn, Oswestry Town, Morecambe, Mold Alexandra, Colne Dynamoes, Bangor City, Newtown, Llansantffraid, Llandudno and Gresford Athletic.

References

1964 births
Living people
People from Bebington
English footballers
Association football midfielders
Wrexham A.F.C. players
IFK Mariehamn players
Oswestry Town F.C. players
Morecambe F.C. players
Mold Alexandra F.C. players
Colne Dynamoes F.C. players
Bangor City F.C. players
Newtown A.F.C. players
The New Saints F.C. players
Llandudno F.C. players
Gresford Athletic F.C. players
English Football League players
Cymru Premier players